The Ambassador of Australia to Japan is an officer of the Australian Department of Foreign Affairs and Trade and the head of the Embassy of the Commonwealth of Australia to Japan. The position has the rank and status of an Ambassador Extraordinary and Plenipotentiary and is based in the Australian Embassy in Tokyo. Peter Roberts  is currently filling in as Chargé d’affaires.

Posting history
Japan and Australia have enjoyed full diplomatic relations since 1940 when the Australian Legation opened and the first Minister, Sir John Latham, presented credentials to Emperor Showa in January 1941. The legation in Japan is one of Australia's earliest independent diplomatic missions outside the British Empire, closely following the legation in the United States established on 1 March 1940. Latham's appointment replaced the semi-diplomatic work of the Australian Trade Commission in Tokyo, headed by trade commissioner Eric Longfield Lloyd, who was appointed in June 1935. 

Longfield Lloyd's work, notwithstanding his limited ability to engage with matters outside of trade, was complicated by his vague status as a 'Trade Commissioner', a title that had no formal recognition of diplomatic status. As Australia was the only nation present in Japan that was represented by someone other than an ambassador, minister or consul, it gradually became clear that a higher-ranked appointment was needed. In November 1937, in order to help clarify his position, the term 'Trade' was removed from Longfield Lloyd's title to become the Australian 'Commissioner' in Tokyo. This did not change his diplomatic status however and Latham's appointment in August 1940 was praised as solving this issue: "[Longfield Lloyd] has been confined almost exclusively to trade matters. In this respect he has rendered excellent service to both countries. The appointment of Sir John Latham, however, to a diplomatic post in Japan is something of far more importance."

Full diplomatic relations were severed between December 1941 and 1952 on account of the declaration of war and the post-war occupation of Japan. In March 1947 a new Minister to Japan was appointed, but rather than being accredited to the Japanese Government they were accredited to the Supreme Commander for the Allied Powers, owing to the Occupation of Japan, and they also served as the British Commonwealth member on the Allied Council for Japan.

List of heads of mission

See also
Japan-Australia relations
Foreign relations of Australia

References

External links

Australian Embassy, Tokyo

 
Japan
Australia